UK Project (stylized as UK.PROJECT) is a Japanese independent record label and an artist management company which runs various music labels, artist management agencies and concert venues under its umbrella company.

History 
UK Project was founded in September 1987 with the theme of "discovering unknown ones" and has been operating under this concept ever since. The company is not registered with the Recording Industry Association of Japan, and as such is still regarded as an independent "indie" music company.

In April 1989, the first record under UK Project was released. The company itself, UK Project Co., Ltd. was established in December 1991.

UK Project initially signed a contract with Toshiba EMI (currently, Universal EMI R/EMI Records) in 1994 but the contract was dissolved in 1997.

UK Project operates under the model of dividing its artist management arm and its record production arm through the creation of fully owned private limited record labels under the umbrella of UK.Project. Artists signed to UK Project are usually managed by UK Project or one of its artist management companies, and/or have their records released under UK Project or one of its labels, or both.

Some notable UK Project-owned labels include RX-Records
and Daizawa Records.
Other than these two labels, UK Project continues to actively release records under their other brands, such as the Rice Records and Benten labels.

UK.Project also owns and operates a few music venues and restaurants in Tokyo, including Club Que in Tokyo's Shimokitazawa and Zher the Zoo in Tokyo's Yoyogi.

UK Project is based in Daizawa, Setagaya, Tokyo.

In spite of its "indie" label, UK Project is a prolific music company that has signed many Japanese indie-rock bands which later went on to commercial success. Many of UK Project bands have appear in major TV programs, as well as major music festivals including Rock in Japan Festival, Countdown Japan and Fuji Rock Festival.

Labels 
 Wonder Release Records (August 1991 - )
 Rice Records
 TV-Freak Records (July 1997 - )
 Aaron field (September 1997 - )
 Tinstar Records (1998 - )
 Deckrec (February 1999 - )
 Libra records (May 1999 - )
 Daizawa Records (2001 - )
 Famires Records (2001 - )
 RX-Records (2005 - )

Management agencies 
  (2001-)
 UKPM Co.,Ltd. (formerly ) (2002 -)

Artists

Current 

 Alexandros
 Asobius
 Cettia
 Dats
 Dip
 Fullarmor
 Helsinki Lambda Club
 Kettles
 Lost In Time
 Odol
 Ogre You Asshole (co-production with OYA)
 Paionia
 Pelican Fanclub
 Polly
 Riddle
 Ryoji & The Last Chords
 Seagull Screaming Kiss Her Kiss Her
 Spicysol
 Syrup16g
 Totalfat
 Tomovsky
 Your Gold My Pink

Previous notable artists 

 Art-School
 Base Ball Bear
 Bazra
 Bigmama
 Boris
 Burger Nuds
 Condor44
 DMBQ
 Flamong Echo
 Doe
 Going Steady
 Hare-brained Unity
 Lite
 Lostage
 Karen
 Kishidan (氣志團) 
 Mo'Some Tonebender
 Modern Dollz
 Nananine
 Pre-school
 Pop chocolat
 Potshot
 Polysics
 Scoobie Do
 Serial TV Drama
 Sparta Locals
 The Boom
 The Novembers
 The Telephones
 Thee Michelle Gun Elephant
 Tommy and the Bonjaskys (an offshoot of Kishidan, led by guitarist Saionji "Long Tall Tommy" Hitomi for one mini album in 2008) 
 Unison Square Garden
 Vola and the Oriental Machine
 Wrong Scale
 Wrecking Crew
 Your Song Is Good

Other activities

Venues 
Shimokitazawa Club QUE (born October 1994)

Club Que is a fixture in Tokyo's Shimokitazawa and is one of the more prominent live venues in the city. The venue hosts a variety of live performances of bands from all genres, although it is more geared towards rock acts. The club also hosts DJ and club events after hours. Club Que has a capacity of 280 people.

Zher the Zoo Yoyogi (opened February 2005)

Zher the Zoo is located in Yoyogi in Tokyo's Shibuya district. It is a concert venue with a capacity of 280 people and is a bar after hours.

 (September 2006 - )

Fuchi Kuchi is a small intimate casual dining restaurant located in Shimokitazawa. It has an indoor eating space, a terrance as well as an event space. As such, it sometimes hosts live acoustic performances.

UKFC on the Road 
Since 2011, UK Project has held an annual summer event named "UKFC on the Road", which started as a nationwide tour but has since evolved into a two-day music festival with current and previous UK Project bands, as well as foreign and affiliated bands.

UKFC on the Road 2011
Venue/Dates: Zepp Sendai (August 11, 2011), Niigata Lots (August 10, 2011), Fukuoka Drum Logos (19 August 2011)
Artists: Bigmama, Champagne, Polysics, The Novembers, The Telephones

UKFC on the Road 2012
Venues/Dates: Osaka Big Cat (July 25, 2012), Nagoya Club Diamond Hall (July 26, 2012), Niigata Lots (August 1, 2012), Sendai Rensa (August 2, 2012), Fukuoka Drum Logos (August 24, 2012)
Artists: Champagne, Bigmama, The Novembers, Polysics, The Telephones

Venue/Date: Tokyo, Shinkiba Studio Coast (August 14, 2012)
Artists: Champagne, The Novembers, Bigmama, Polysics, Lost In Time, The Telephones, The ★ 米騒動, Paionia, 武藤昭平 with ウエノコウジ, Riddle

UKFC on the Road 2013

2013 was the first year the annual tour became a music festival event held at Studio Coast in Shin Kiba, Tokyo with live performances and DJ sets.
Date: August 20, 2013
Artists: Champagne, Bazra, Bigmama, 伊藤文暁, Lost In Time, Potshot, Paionia, Riddle, Totalfat, つづくバンド, Unison Square Garden, ゾンビちゃん
DJs: 片平実 (Getting Better), 石毛 輝 (The Telephones)

Date: August 8, 2013
Artists: Dad Mom God, Dip, DJ ハヤシ／五十嵐 隆(弾き語り), Killing Boy, Mo’Some Tonebender, The Novembers, Ogre You Asshole, Polysics, The Telephones, ゾンビちゃん
DJs: 片平実 (Getting Better), 庄村聡泰([Alexandros]), Shun (Totalfat)

Date: August 22, 2013
Artists: Asobius, Bigmama, Champagne, Kettles, The ★ 米騒動, The Novembers, Polysics, 静カニ潜ム日々, The Telephones, うみのて／ゾンビちゃん
DJs: 片平実 (Getting Better), Bunta&Kuboty (Totalfat)

UKFC on the Road 2014

In 2014, UKFC on the Road grew into a massive event with a tour, a two-day festival at Studio Coast and additional performances at the Monster Bash music festival. The event in 2014 also had live performances by UK Project bands past and present, DJ sets and foreign bands.

Venue/Date: Osaka Big Cat (July 15, 2014)
Artists: Alexandros, Bigmama, Totalfat, (opening act) DJハヤシ

Venue/Date: Nagoya Diamond Hall (July 16, 2014)
Artists: Alexandros, The Telephones, Totalfat, (opening act) きのこ帝国

Venue/Date: Sendai Rensa (August 8, 2013)
Artists: Bigmama, Polysics, The Telephones, (opening act) Asobius

Venue/Date: Shin Kiba Studio Coast (August 20, 2014)
Artists: Alexandros, Asobius, Bigmama, 銀杏Boyz (solo), 松本素生 (Going Under Ground), Mo'Some TOonebender, Pee Wee Gaskins (from Indonesia), Polysics, The Telephones, Totalfat, Helsinki Lambda Club, pirukuru, (DJ )片平実 (Getting Better)

Venue/Date: Shin Kiba Studio Coast (August 21, 2014)
Artists: Alexandros, Bigmama, 勝手にしやがれ, きのこ帝国, Magumi and the Breathless, ニューロティカ, Polysics, The Telephones, Totalfat, ウソツキ, Cettia, (DJ)片平実 (Getting Better)

Event: UKFC on the Road 2014 extra in Monster Bash
Venue: Kanagawa, Kokueisanukimann no Koen (August 23, 2014)
Artists: Asobius, Bigmama, Mo'Some Tonebender, Polysics, The Telephones, Totalfat
DJs: Bunta&Kuboty (Totalfat), DJハヤシ(Polysics), DJノブ (The Telephones)

UKFC on the Road 2015

The event in 2015 was smaller than the previous year. It was again held as a two-day event at Studio Coast in Shin Kiba. Instead, the event this year became more of a music festival, with three stages. Two stages located in the main hall had live performances, while a stage in the building foyer had DJ sets. As with past years, current and past UK Project bands and affiliated bands, as well as a foreign band, performed in the event on both days.

Date: August 18, 2015
Artists: Alexandros, Marmozets, Mo'Some Tonebender, Straightener, ストレイテナー, Totalfat, The Novembers, Asobius, Cettia, Dats, Lost In Time, Pelican Fanclub
DJs: ヒサシ the Kid (The Jerry Lee Phantom/The Beaches), 片平実 (Getting Better), 木下理樹 (Art-School/KillingBoy), 西村道男 (Getting Better), 斎藤雄(Getting Better), しもっきー (a.k.a.自称下北沢の守り神)

Date: August 19, 2015
Artists: Bigmama, Downy, キュウソネコカミ, Orange Range, Polysics, The Telephones, Helsinki Lambda Club, 武藤昭平 with ウエノコウジ, odol, polly, Spicysol, ウソツキ
DJs: 片平実 (Getting Better), K(uchuu,), 木下理樹 (Art-School/KillingBoy), 西村道男 (Getting Better), 斎藤雄 (Getting Better), しもっきー(a.k.a.自称下北沢の守り神), タロウサイファイ (Avengers in sci-fi)

Highline Record 
Highline Record was an indie record store and record label located in Shimokitazawa, Tokyo. It was established in 1997 by a subsidiary of Space Shower TV. The record store at that time was managed by UK Project.

In 2002, Highline Records became a fully owned subsidiary of UK.Project.

Notable Highline Record artists were Bump of Chicken, Good Dog Happy Man and Nananine. Highline Record was dissolved in July 2006.

References

External links 
 UK Project official web site
 UK Project official YouTube channel
 UK Project official Twitter
 UK Project official Facebook
 RX-Records official web site
 Club Que official web site
 Zher the Zoo Yoyogi official web site

Japanese record labels
Record labels established in 1991
1991 establishments in Japan